Fred Dow Fagg Jr. (1896 – October 14, 1981) was president of the University of Southern California between 1947 and 1957.

Biography 
Fagg attended the University of Redlands, where he was a founding member of Kappa Sigma Sigma.  During World War I he became a pursuit pilot in the U.S. Air Service, based in England with the 92d Aero Squadron. Fagg received a law degree in 1927 from Northwestern University and later taught there. He was the fourth dean of Kellogg School of Management, from 1937 to 1939. He was also the second of three directors of the short-lived Bureau of Air Commerce in the United States Department of Commerce, from March 1937 to April 1938.

Fagg's son, Fred D. Fagg III, was dean of the Northwestern School of Law at Lewis & Clark (unaffiliated with Northwestern University, now Lewis and Clark Law School.)

References 

History of USC
Kellogg School of Management: History
Northwestern University
Fred D. Fagg, Jr. Papers, Northwestern University Archives, Evanston, Illinois
L&C Chronicle - Our Condolences

External links 

Fred Dow Fagg, Jr. Papers, Northwestern University Archives, Evanston, Illinois

Presidents of the University of Southern California
Northwestern University Pritzker School of Law alumni
1896 births
1981 deaths
Date of birth missing
American expatriates in the United Kingdom
American military personnel of World War I
University of Redlands alumni
20th-century American academics